Senlis is a commune in the Pas-de-Calais department in the Hauts-de-France region of France.

Geography
Senlis is located 15 miles (24 km) east of Montreuil-sur-Mer on the D104 road.

Population

Places of interest
 The church of Notre-Dame, dating from the thirteenth century

See also
Communes of the Pas-de-Calais department

References

Communes of Pas-de-Calais